Xinzhuang is a commuter rail station, adjacent to the Xinzhuang Station (Shanghai Metro) an interchange station on the Shanghai Metro. This station is the second station on Jinshan railway. It was built in the first year of Emperor Xuantong of the Qing Dynasty (1909).

The station is currently under reconstruction to construct a Xinzhuang comprehensive transportation hub. It is expected to reopen in 2024.

References 

Railway stations in Shanghai
Stations on the Shanghai–Kunming Railway
Stations on the Jinshan railway